Kamenz (Sachs) station is a railway station in Kamenz, Germany. The station is located on the Lübbenau–Kamenz and Kamenz–Pirna lines. It is operated by DB Station&Service.

Services

Railway services 
Regular passenger services run only on southbound Kamenz–Pirna railway and are currently operated by DB Regio Südost as part of the Dresden S-Bahn. Trains run on an hourly schedule, with additional peak-hour services.

Occasionally there are tourist passenger services also along northbound Lübbenau–Kamenz railway, branded as Lausitzer Seenlandbahn, offering connections between Dresden and Lusatian Lake District.

A few freight services also operate, mainly along northbound Lübbenau–Kamenz railway.

Local transport 
City bus lines 21, 22 and 23 as well as many regional bus lines frequently stop at this station. The bus station is located on the east side of the railway station.

External links

References 

Railway stations in Saxony
station
Railway stations in Germany opened in 1871